Muhammed Sadique (born 1955) is a Bangladeshi writer and public official. He is a member of Bangladesh Public Service Commission (PSC) and the 13th chairman of the commission since 2 May 2016. He was awarded Bangla Academy Literary Award in 2017 for his contributions to Bengali poetry.

Biography 
Sadique was born in September 1955 at Dharargaon village of Sunamganj District. His father's name is Alhajj Mohammad Mubasshir Ali and mother's name is Mastura Begum.

Sadique received his bachelor's degree in Bengali language and literature in 1976 and master's in 1977. He did research on Sylheti Nagri script and received his Ph.D. from Assam University in 2005. He joined the Bangladesh Civil Service in 1982.

As a member of Bangladesh Civil Service, he served as the Education Secretary of the Government of Bangladesh and as a secretary of the Bangladesh Election Commission. He also served as additional secretary of Ministry of Public Administration, Director General of the Bangladesh Institute of Administration and Management Foundation and Director and Acting Director General of the Bangladesh Civil Service Administration Academy.

He had served as a member of Bangladesh Public Service Commission since 3 November 2014 and appointed as the chairman of the commission on 2 May 2016. On 16 September 2020, he was replaced by Md Sohorab Hossain.

Sadique is a lifetime member of Asiatic Society of Bangladesh and a fellow of Bangla Academy.

Works 
 Agune Rekhechi Haat (1985)
 Trikaaler Shwaralipi (1987)
 Binidro Bollom Haate Shomudrer Shobdo Shuni (1991)
 Ke Loibo Khobor (2010)
 Nirbachito Kobita (2005)
 Shofat Shaher Laathi (2017)
 Kobi Radharomon Datta: Shohojiar Jotil Jamiti (2017)
 Nei Ar Nilakaash, Translated from No Longer at Ease (1960) by Chinua Achebe

References 

Bangladeshi scholars
Living people
1955 births
Recipients of Bangla Academy Award
People from Sunamganj District
Bangladeshi civil servants